The Peralam–Karaikal line is a branch line connects Peralam, Tamil Nadu with Karaikal, Puducherry in South India. It is the one and only unconverted railway line in Puducherry union territory and one of the few unconverted railway lines in southern railway zone. This line is one of the cauvery delta railway line which falls under Tiruchirappalli division.

It is one of the 4 unconverted railway lines in south India. The other 3 are the Mayiladuthurai Junction to Tranquebar railway line and Thiruthuraipoondi Junction to Point Calimere Railway line. The works are going on a fast phase at Bodi nayakkanur to Madurai Junction Railway line section, Currently operational till Theni Railway station.

The three railway lines, Tranquebar railway line, Peralam-Karaikal railway line and Point Calimere railway line were closed during the 1980s due to poor patronage citing unviability. But now they are under consideration for conversion to broad gauge lines.

On the 2020-21 February Indian budget ₹88 crores were sanctioned for this line out of the total ₹177 crores. And all railway work on this line is planned to be completed by March 2024.

History 

Route 

Operations

Passenger services 
Though owned by French India, the operations were transferred to the then Great South Indian Railway in accordance with agreement signed in 1902. There were 4 up-and-down services, but due improvement in road connectivity the earnings dropped and subsequently the services were reduced to one in 1943. After Indian Independence and Railway Re-organisation, the line fell into the jurisdiction of Tiruchirappalli railway division. In 1967, citing under utilisation of the line for passenger traffic in its transport survey, the National Council for Applied and Economic Research recommended for closure of the line.

Freight services 
Cement, fertilisers, tiles, timber, kerosene oil, rice, wheat, grains, pulses and paddy were the main goods involved in traffic. Raw materials like pressed cotton and coal for textile mills and iron billets for Pondicherry Rolling Mills were brought in, processed and the finished product was supplied all over the country. Though the goods traffic density fared better, the passenger traffic slumped and services were called off except the rolling stock.

Gauge conversion
In June 2019 tenders were floated for the execution of the project, expecting to complete it by March 2021.

References 
https://www.thehindu.com/news/cities/Tiruchirapalli/17769-crore-sanctioned-for-laying-karaikal-peralam-railway-line/article26611268.ece

External links 
 Southern Railways - Official Website

Rail transport in Tamil Nadu
Railway lines opened in 1898
Railway lines closed in 1987
Transport in Karaikal
Rail transport in Puducherry